Loubens-Lauragais is a commune in the Haute-Garonne department in southwestern France.

Demography

See also
Communes of the Haute-Garonne department

References

External links

 The Castle
  Chateaux France

Communes of Haute-Garonne